Ahmed Mogni (born 10 October 1991) is a professional footballer who plays as a midfielder. Born in France, he plays for the Comoros national team.

Club career
Born in Paris, Mogni trained with Paris Université Club until the age of 17, and then with FC Issy-les-Moulineaux, Boulogne-Billancourt and played for Évry in the fifth level of French football. In 2014 he signed with the reserve team of Paris FC, and after a good season he signed a professional contract with the club.

Mogni made his Ligue 2 debut with Paris FC on 23 October 2015, in the 1–1 draw with Chamois Niortais.

Mogni re-signed for Boulogne-Billancourt against for the 2017–18 season, and after a season there moved to FC 93. In June 2020 he moved to Annecy. Mogni scored two goals on his competitive debut for Annecy against Le Mans in a 3–3 draw on 21 August 2020.

International career
Mogni made his international debut for Comoros in 2015, and was a squad member at the 2021 Africa Cup of Nations. He scored two goals in a 3–2 group match victory over Ghana in what the BBC described as "one of the biggest shocks in Nations Cup history".

References

External links
 

Living people
1991 births
French sportspeople of Comorian descent
French footballers
Comorian footballers
Footballers from Paris
Association football midfielders
Comoros international footballers
2021 Africa Cup of Nations players
Paris Université Club footballers
Évry FC players
Paris FC players
Football Club 93 Bobigny-Bagnolet-Gagny players
FC Annecy players
Ligue 2 players
Championnat National players
Championnat National 2 players
Championnat National 3 players